La Calahorra is a municipality, part of the Comarca de Guadix, located about in the middle of the Province of Granada, Spain. According to the 2019 census, the town has a population of 673 inhabitants.

Nearby, in the Sierra Nevada foothills, is the Castillo de La Calahorra. Built between 1509 and 1512, it is one of the first Italian Renaissance castles outside Italy.

The town aims to become a site of sky free of light pollution conservation  following nearby Sierra de los Filabres and Sierra Nevada Starlight Foundation  certification project.

It is well known, as the setting of the final scenes in the 1974 David Essex film Stardust.

References

Municipalities in the Province of Granada